Eriovixia is a genus of orb-weaver spiders first described by Allan Frost Archer in 1951.

Species
 it contains thirty-three species found throughout Africa and Asia:
Eriovixia bannaensis Zhou, Zhu & Zhang, 2017 – China
Eriovixia cavaleriei (Schenkel, 1963) – China
Eriovixia enshiensis (Yin & Zhao, 1994) – China
Eriovixia excelsa (Simon, 1889) – India, Pakistan, China, Taiwan, Philippines, Indonesia
Eriovixia ganae Mi & Li, 2021 – China
Eriovixia gryffindori Ahmed, Khalap & Sumukha, 2016 – India
Eriovixia hainanensis (Yin, Wang, Xie & Peng, 1990) – China
Eriovixia huwena Han & Zhu, 2010 – China
Eriovixia jianfengensis Han & Zhu, 2010 – China
Eriovixia kachugaonensis P. Basumatary, Chanda, Das, Kalita, Brahma, T. Basumatary, B. K. Basumatary & Daimary, 2019 – India
Eriovixia laglaizei (Simon, 1877) – India, Bangladesh, China to Philippines, New Guinea
Eriovixia liuhongi Mi & Li, 2021 – China
Eriovixia mahabaeus (Barrion & Litsinger, 1995) – Philippines
Eriovixia menglunensis (Yin, Wang, Xie & Peng, 1990) – China
Eriovixia napiformis (Thorell, 1899) – Cameroon to East Africa, Yemen
Eriovixia nigrimaculata Han & Zhu, 2010 – China
Eriovixia nocturnalis Biswas & Raychaudhuri, 2018 – Bangladesh
Eriovixia palawanensis (Barrion & Litsinger, 1995) – India, Philippines
Eriovixia patulisus (Barrion & Litsinger, 1995) – Philippines
Eriovixia pengi Mi & Li, 2021 – China
Eriovixia poonaensis (Tikader & Bal, 1981) – India, China
Eriovixia porcula (Simon, 1877) – Singapore, Philippines
Eriovixia pseudocentrodes (Bösenberg & Strand, 1906) – China, Laos, Japan
Eriovixia rhinura (Pocock, 1900) – West, Central Africa
Eriovixia sakiedaorum Tanikawa, 1999 – China (Hainan), Taiwan, Japan
Eriovixia sticta Mi, Peng & Yin, 2010 – China
Eriovixia tangi Mi & Li, 2021 – China
Eriovixia turbinata (Thorell, 1899) – Cameroon, Congo
Eriovixia wangchengi Mi & Li, 2021 – China
Eriovixia yaoi Mi & Li, 2021 – China
Eriovixia yinae Mi & Li, 2021 – China
Eriovixia yunnanensis (Yin, Wang, Xie & Peng, 1990) – China
Eriovixia zhengi Mi & Li, 2021 – China

References

Araneidae
Araneomorphae genera
Spiders of Africa
Spiders of Asia